Vito Plut (born 8 July 1988) is a Slovenian footballer who plays for Gudja United as a forward.

Honours

Maribor
Slovenian PrvaLiga: 2008–09
Slovenian Cup: 2009–10
Slovenian Supercup: 2009

References

External links
 
 Player profile at NZS 

1988 births
Living people
People from the Municipality of Semič
Slovenian footballers
Slovenia youth international footballers
Slovenia under-21 international footballers
Association football forwards
Slovenian PrvaLiga players
Belgian Pro League players
3. Liga players
Maltese Premier League players
Regionalliga players
FC Koper players
NK Maribor players
ND Gorica players
S.K. Beveren players
1. FC Saarbrücken players
Floriana F.C. players
Birkirkara F.C. players
FSV Frankfurt players
Tarxien Rainbows F.C. players
St. Lucia F.C. players
Gudja United F.C. players
Slovenian expatriate footballers
Expatriate footballers in Belgium
Expatriate footballers in Germany
Expatriate footballers in Malta
Slovenian expatriate sportspeople in Belgium
Slovenian expatriate sportspeople in Germany